"Girlfight" is the debut single of R&B singer Brooke Valentine, featuring American rappers Lil Jon and Big Boi from Outkast. It serves as the first single from her debut album, Chain Letter. The song is about a tension between two girls who end up in a catfight and was a US top-thirty hit, peaking at number 23 on the Billboard Hot 100 in June 2005. A remix was made which features Da Brat, Ms. B and Remy Ma.

Online game
An online game titled Brooke Valentine Presents Celebrity Girl Fight was released online where the user fights female celebrities, including Ciara, Beyoncé, Paris Hilton, Jennifer Lopez, Lindsay Lohan and Lil' Kim.

Track listings

US 12-inch single
A1. "Girlfight" (clean radio edit) – 3:36
A2. "Girlfight" (instrumental) – 3:33
A3. "Girlfight" (clean a capella) – 3:34
B1. "Girlfight" (explicit radio edit) – 3:36
B2. "Girlfight" (explicit extended edit) – 3:55
B3. "Girlfight" (explicit a capella) – 3:35

UK CD single
 "Girlfight" (album version) – 3:54
 "Girlfight" (remix) – 4:12

UK 12-inch single
A1. "Girlfight" – 3:54
A2. "Girlfight" (remix) – 4:12
B1. "Girlfight" (reggaeton remix) – 4:14

European CD single
 "Girlfight" (album version) – 3:54
 "Girlfight" (remix) – 4:12
 "Girlfight" (reggaeton mix) – 4:14
 "Girlfight" (instrumental) – 3:33
 "Girlfight" (video) – 3:45

Australian CD single
 "Girlfight" – 3:54
 "Thrill of the Chase" – 3:07
 "Girlfight Pt. II" – 3:21

Charts

Weekly charts

Year-end charts

Release history

References

2004 songs
2005 debut singles
Big Boi songs
Brooke Valentine songs
Lil Jon songs
Music videos directed by Chris Robinson (director)
Song recordings produced by Lil Jon
Songs written by Big Boi
Songs written by Lil Jon
Songs written by Tricky Stewart
Virgin Records singles